Pouncing is an art technique used for transferring an image from one surface to another using a fine powder called pounce. It is similar to tracing, and is useful for creating copies of a sketch outline to produce finished works.

Art 
Pouncing has been a common technique for centuries, used to create copies of portraits and other works that would be finished as oil paintings, engravings, and so on. The most common method involves laying semi-transparent paper over the original image, then tracing along the lines of the image by creating pricked marks on the top sheet of paper.  This pounced drawing made of pricked holes is laid over a new working surface. A powder such as chalk, graphite or pastel is forced through the holes to leave an outline on the working surface below, thus transferring the image. The powder is applied by being placed into a small bag of thin fabric such as cheesecloth, then dabbed onto the pricked holes of the pounced drawing.

Examples of pouncing in art

See also

 Chalk
 Pastels
 List of art techniques

References

Drawing
Artistic techniques
Hole making
Copying